This is a list of characters from the television series Jericho, which premiered in 2006 on CBS in the United States.

Main characters

Jake Green
 Portrayed by Skeet Ulrich
 Appears in: Season 1, Season 2
 Status: Alive

Johnston Jacob "Jake" Green, Jr. is the oldest son of the Green family, as it was stated on the CBS website, and the principal character of the series.  Jake was once a member of Jonah Prowse's group of survivalists; and, after a botched armed robbery job, in which Chris Sullivan (Jonah's son and the brother of Jake's girlfriend, Emily Sullivan) was killed, Jake fled Jericho.  Five years later, Jake returned to Jericho to pay his respects to his recently deceased grandfather and to claim the money his grandfather left him. Because of the problems in their relationship, his father refused to hand over the money; and Jake was leaving town again when he witnessed the destruction of Denver.

Jake was initially an unlikely hero, but his checkered past helped in Jericho's trying times. He took charge of getting people to safety and eventually people came to look upon him as a leader.  He and his father repaired their relationship and with his father's blessing, Jake put together the Jericho Rangers to help keep Jericho safe.  Jake frequently left Jericho for supplies or information and on other missions—including rescuing his brother from New Bern, training the Rangers in gun skills and defending the town from Ravenwood, a private military company and the New Bern Army. Although he is impulsive, he is also intelligent, often coming up with ideas that help the town.

In Season 2, with the garrisoning and reconstruction of Jericho by the Allied States of America (ASA) Army, the garrison commander and chief administrator, Major Edward Beck, recognized Jake as one the others follow and listen to in the heat of conflict and appointed him Sheriff. Jake and the rest of Jericho witnessed the domination of the ASA and Jennings & Rall (J&R) over the town and the country at large, with Jake knowing first-hand how dangerous J&R was when it came to business dealings. Having previously been deliberately misleading and vague about his past, Jake came clean to Eric and explained what he did during his absence. Jake worked as a private military contractor for J&R in Iraq and Afghanistan, which explains how Jake is shown to be accurate with a revolver at a distance. He left the service of J&R and vowed never to return after he took part in a massacre in Iraq with other Ravenwood mercenaries and his passport is flagged for non-cooperation on an undercover mission against Ravenwood. The incident has haunted him, as he killed several innocent civilians, including a little girl. Jake graduated from Embry-Riddle Aeronautical University (prior to leaving Jericho for five years). He had initially started flying with his grandfather when he was a teen, and has over 1,500 flight hours.

Jake secretly worked with Robert Hawkins, whom he eventually saw as a friend, to get the last remaining nuclear bomb from the September Attacks to the Independent Republic of Texas. They expose the conspiracy behind the attacks but inadvertently start the Second American Civil War.

Rob Hawkins
 Portrayed by Lennie James
 Appears in: Season 1, Season 2
 Status: Alive

Robert "Rob" Hawkins was, during most of Season 1, an enigma, with no one sure whether he was a goodie or a baddie. He had secrets he was unwilling to share, even with his family. His history had estranged him from his wife and children but they are the only ones he cares about—when he realized the September Attacks were coming, his first thought was to get them to safety.

Hawkins moved to Jericho with his wife, Darcy and his two children, Alison and Samuel, three days before the attacks. He paid cash for the "Thompson house", leading to much gossip around the town about his background. Hawkins claimed he was a former police officer from St. Louis, Missouri and explains his knowledge and expertise comes from having received training from the Department of Homeland Security after the September 11, 2001, attacks. The family had really been living in Washington, D.C.  When cornered, Hawkins claimed to be working undercover for the FBI to learn more about "suspicious contacts in this area" that may be linked to the Attacks.

Unknown to the rest of the town, Hawkins is deeply involved in clandestine activities. These include secret communications with unknown persons through a locked laptop computer, the monitoring of shortwave radio messages and the storage of a large unmarked barrel containing the 20-kiloton (kt) nuclear device that he was assigned to deliver to Columbus, Ohio, and detonate. He is later contacted by his associates, who know that he is lying to them.

Though his family initially did not know the truth, they keep a low profile and constantly rehearse their cover story but, eventually, he reveals the truth to them and to Jake that he is a CIA deep-cover covert operations officer and a U.S. government agent who took part in Project Red Bell, a task force sent to recover a shipment of stolen Russian warheads and stop the bombing. Even though he failed in that, he still had one of the bombs, which could be used to uncover the conspiracy that started it all. Hawkins proves his loyalty to Jericho over the course of Season 1.

In Season 2, Hawkins and Jericho saw the rise of the ASA and its dominance over the country. Seeing the ASA was attempting to dominate the country and bury the truth behind the Attacks, Hawkins and Jake teamed up to deliver the bomb to the Independent Republic of Texas to expose the conspiracy, which started the Second American Civil War.

Emily Sullivan
 Portrayed by Ashley Scott
 Appears in: Season 1, Season 2
 Status: Alive

Emily Sullivan-Prowse is Jonah Prowse's daughter and has lived in Jericho all her life. She and Jake Green were once engaged, but had a falling-out due to Jake's involvement with her father, Mitch Cafferty and her brother, Chris Sullivan, in a botched armed robbery which results in Chris's death. Emily almost hates Jake for a time, and is more strongly estranged from her father.

At the time of the bombings, Emily, like Heather Lisinski, is a school teacher (whose pupils include Dale Turner). Before her father is exiled from Jericho, he and Emily have a heart-to-heart talk, leading to a partial reconciliation.

A love triangle develops between Emily, Jake and Heather. When Heather leaves for New Bern, Emily begins to get closer with Jake; this development is interrupted by the unexpected return of her fiancé Roger Hammond, who is soon exiled from Jericho.

Emily assists the Jericho Rangers and helps Jake work through his grief at his father's death.

Heather Lisinski
 Portrayed by Sprague Grayden
 Appears in: Season 1, Season 2
 Status: Alive

Heather Lisinski is an elementary school teacher who grew up in New Bern; she is described as a tomboy, whose main interests are science and mechanics. Following the September Attacks, Heather continues as a school teacher, and falls for Jake Green after watching him save a child from death. A strong connection between them lasts a while, though ultimately they do not come together. Heather returns to New Bern to work on the wind turbines that Jericho needs for power. She is almost killed there and then taken to Camp Liberty, Nebraska: an army camp of the new Allied States of America.

In Season 2, Heather alerts the ASA to the New Bern War, and Major Beck and his battalion are sent to end the conflict. Heather safely returns to Jericho, and having impressed Colonel Robert Hoffman, commander of Camp Liberty, becomes a liaison to Major Beck, the new military overseer of the area encompassing both Jericho and New Bern. Heather is later informed by Jake and Hawkins about the truth of the September Attacks, as well as about the intentions of the Cheyenne government, as they must entrust her with a dangerous task that could save the country. Trusting Jake, Heather helps them keep the secret of the last bomb. When Beck learns of this, she accuses him of cowardice in blinding himself to the truth of the new government; Beck then sides with Jericho against the ASA.

Dale Turner
 Portrayed by Erik Knudsen
 Appears in: Season 1, Season 2
 Status: Alive

Dale Turner is a teenager who works at Gracie's Market.  His mother is killed by one of the bombs, in Atlanta.  Dale finds a trainload of undelivered supplies near the town, and uses them to restock the store.  He has an interest in Skylar Stevens, and overcomes her snobbish disdain by bringing her supplies from the store; she even asks him to stay with her after his own home burns down, and bails him out of jail when he briefly aids Mitchell Cafferty's activities in Jericho.  This friendship with Skylar leads to a falling-out with Gracie; but when Gracie is murdered she leaves the store to Dale, and he vows revenge, not knowing whom to blame until Mitch demands half the store's profits lest he "end up like Gracie."  With no one able or willing to help him resist Mitch's harassment, Dale shoots Mitch and successfully hides the body.  Soon afterward, Skylar joins Dale in running the business, and the two develop a romantic connection.

In Season 2, Dale continues running his business with Skylar, and hires many refugees.  When the ASA severely restricts commerce, Dale turns to smuggling; among other things he obtains a vaccine for the Hudson River Virus, helping Jericho and surrounding communities to inoculate themselves. Goetz, as new chief administrator, discovers Dale's role and makes an example of him by sending him to Loomer Ridge Prison. Jake and the Jericho Rangers stop the military transport carrying Dale and persuade Beck to declare Dale a "confidential terror informant", making him and his business immune to Goetz's interference.

Gray Anderson
 Portrayed by Michael Gaston
 Appears in: Season 1, Season 2
 Status: Alive

Gray Anderson is the owner of the Jericho salt mines and Mayor Johnston Green's main political rival. After the September Attacks, Gray is among those who go out to scout the country. When Gray returns, having witnessed the confusion, devastation and atrocities in the aftermath of the Attacks, he gains considerable respect for having seen first-hand the dangers outside of town. Gray brings with him the news that New York City has survived but Washington, D.C., has not, nor has Lawrence. Eventually, Gray wins election as mayor, defeating Johnston; and one of his first priorities is to find a new power source, leading to the construction of a power-generating wind turbine. Gray is portrayed as more of a businessman than a leader of the community and is seen to crack under pressure, leaving others (Johnston, Eric, Jake etc.) to take the initiative; for example, when Gray is near surrender during the early stages of the New Bern War, the Jericho Rangers take charge and defend the town against the invasion.

In Season 2, Gray quickly tries to gain the favor of the Allied States of America, upon the garrisoning of an ASA Army battalion in the town, which Gray saw as a more positive development than others did. Eventually, he is invited by ASA President John Tomarchio to a political conference in Cheyenne. Although uneasy about the new regime, Gray accepts the invitation, leaving Eric Green to take his place as acting mayor and promising to get answers from the ASA. In the Season 2 finale, Gray is contacted by Jake Green and Robert Hawkins to get enough access into ASA's system to find the bomb. Gray, disillusioned with the new government and opposing its plans for the country, returns to Jericho. Upon arrival, he finds and sees first-hand how Jericho has suffered under Major Beck's lockdown. When Major Beck and his forces reject Cheyenne's leadership and side with the town, Gray raises Johnston Green's Gadsden flag and tells the Rangers that it was about time that Johnston's voice was heard again; the town needed it as it awaits the coming of the Second American Civil War.

Johnston Green
 Portrayed by Gerald McRaney
 Appears in: Season 1
 Status: Deceased
 Died in: Season 1

Johnston Jacob Green, Sr. is the husband of Gail and father of Eric and Jake. He is a former sergeant in the U.S. Army Rangers and like his father before him, a longtime Mayor of Jericho. He neglected some of his family duties in order to "better serve the town", in violation of a promise to Gail. A strong man, Johnston knew what was right and wrong and was proud of his town. He was also not on good terms with his oldest son, Jake. After the attacks, he takes the lead in organizing the relief effort, and later, guided the citizens of Jericho in their fight for survival.  His decisions are often unpopular (leading to electoral defeat by Gray Anderson), but usually vindicated by events. In the Season 1 finale, Johnston dies of a gunshot wound in the New Bern War.

Eric Green
 Portrayed by Kenneth Mitchell
 Appears in: Season 1, Season 2
 Status: Alive

Eric Green is Jake's younger brother. At the time of the September Attacks, Eric is deputy mayor, trying hard to emulate his father, Johnston Green. He helps his father run the town from the background, often being Johnston's eyes and ears about the town. Unhappily married to April Green, he is in love with Mary Bailey, the owner of Bailey's Tavern.

Following the Attacks, Eric takes on the role of a Deputy Sheriff as well as his original post. Eric wants to be with Mary, but events after the bombs keep him from her side at first. Eventually, Eric reveals to April that he is having an affair with Mary, and decides to leave April out of his love for Mary. He later discovers that April had planned to file for divorce before the attacks, but changed her mind after the attacks, and that she is pregnant with their child. After his father tries to talk to him, Eric decides that he may have never loved April at all, but wants to be there for the child.

Both April and the baby die from an early complicated labor. Eric feels great guilt and goes to New Bern to work on building the wind turbines to escape from his troubles. When he does not return from New Bern with the other workers, Jake and Robert Hawkins go to investigate, and find Eric in jail. Jake is also arrested; both are rescued by Robert and Johnston. Recovering somewhat, Eric later fights alongside the assembled Jericho Rangers in the New Bern War.

In Season 2, Eric and Jake continue to mourn their father's death during the war, with Eric's anguish so severe it nearly drives him to get himself killed by the A.S. Army, but with Jake's support and advice, Eric recovers. With Gray Anderson away in Cheyenne, Eric becomes acting mayor, and so leads the Jericho Rangers on a raid to help recover his brother, Jake, who was held and tortured by Major Beck during the A.S. Army's lockdown of Jericho.

Gail Green

 Portrayed by Pamela Reed
 Appears in: Season 1, Season 2
 Status: Alive

Gail Green is a former nurse, married to Johnston Green, is the mother of Eric and Jake. Gail fights to keep her family together, even though she knows Johnston and Jake do not get along. A strong woman, Gail shows her caring and motherly nature in many of ways. Following the September Attacks, Gail performs mouth to mouth resuscitation on Victor Miller, a man dying of radiation poisoning, and resumes working as a full-time nurse. Gail is also the one Jake turns to the most in the family; and she helps him by giving him advice, which helps Jake and Johnston reconcile their differences. 

In Season 2, following the death of Johnston, Gail grieves in seclusion, and ultimately leaves Jericho. However, in the Season 2 finale, Gail, finally finding peace, returns to Jericho during its military lockdown and helps the Jericho Rangers locate Jake, so that he can be rescued from Major Beck's captivity.

Bonnie Richmond
 Portrayed by Shoshannah Stern
 Appears in: Season 1, Season 2
 Status: Deceased
 Died in: Season 2

Bonnie Richmond is Stanley's younger sister. She helps Stanley run their farm, and volunteers at the medical clinic. She is deaf and communicates via American Sign Language and lip reading. She struggles being around people who will not or cannot communicate with her via sign language. She was a rebellious teenager and, following the September Attacks, disapproved of seeing Stanley and Mimi Clark together. However, they eventually bond and Bonnie comes around to the idea of Stanley and Mimi being together, with the three of them forming a loving family.  When John Goetz attacks Mimi to hide his embezzlement from Jennings & Rall, Bonnie shoots most of his men before being killed by Goetz himself. Bonnie's murder is the catalyst for the citizens of Jericho to take a stand against Goetz.

Stanley Richmond
 Portrayed by Brad Beyer
 Appears in: Season 1, Season 2
 Status: Alive

Stanley Richmond is a sweet, kind and fun-loving farmer in Jericho and just happens to be Jake's best friend since childhood. When his parents were killed in a car accident, Stanley willingly sacrificed his chance at a football scholarship to take care of his deaf baby sister Bonnie.

Following the September Attacks, Stanley shows his inner strength in many ways. He falls in love with Mimi Clark, and they marry at the end of season 2.

Stanley visits the darkness in his soul after killing Goetz, who killed his sister in his attempt to cover up his crimes against Jennings & Rall.

Mimi Clark
 Portrayed by Alicia Coppola
 Appears in: Season 1, Season 2
 Status: Alive

Mimi Clark was originally an IRS agent, comes from Washington, D.C. to audit Stanley's farm. After the September Attacks, Mimi finds herself stranded in Jericho; after her motel closes, she writes off some of Stanley's debt in exchange for room and board at the Richmond farm.  At first she presents a strong face to the world, but breaks down as she becomes aware that her family and friends in Washington are probably dead. Stanley comforts Mimi in her time of despair, and the two eventually develop a relationship. Mimi never expected to fall for Stanley, but once she realized how much he meant to her, she supports him and tries to help both him and Bonnie, Stanley's sister, as much as she can. Although the relationship between them appears to be stormy in the beginning, they both eventually express their love to each other and get engaged. Stanley's sister hated her at first, but the two eventually bond.

In Season 2, Mimi's role is further developed when she is upgraded to main character status. With the re-connection of Jericho to the outside world, Mimi becomes an employee of Jennings & Rall, meanwhile helping Stanley get out of a contract that would in effect give J&R his farm. She eventually discovers that $10,000 has been embezzled by Ravenwood contractor John Goetz. In an effort to suppress the evidence, Goetz attacks the farm, killing Bonnie and wounding Mimi; but Goetz is exposed by Trish and killed by Stanley. Mimi and Stanley become engaged in the first episode of season 2 and exchange vows, in the style of marriage by declaration, over Bonnie's fresh grave in the series finale.

Major Edward Beck
 Portrayed by Esai Morales
 Appears in: Season 2
 Status: Alive

Edward Beck (portrayed by Esai Morales) appeared only in Season 2. Beck was a Major in the U.S. Army's 10th Mountain Division and afterward in the A.S. Army, with a strong reputation for competence. His wife was in Santa Fe when the September Attacks occurred, but he remains confident that she is alive despite failed attempts to contact her.

Beck's battalion is sent by Colonel Robert Hoffman to occupy the towns of Jericho and New Bern to stop the war between them.  As the area's military commander and chief administrator, he garrisons and reconstructs Jericho, and puts New Bern under lockdown for starting the conflict. Beck often clashes with the townspeople. Beck publicly considers his primary mission to be peacekeeping and the restoration of order, and is determined to bring the town to heel. On Hoffman's specific recommendation, Beck hires Heather to be a liaison between Jericho and New Bern, and appoints Jake as the new Sheriff, recognizing him as "the guy" whom others follow and listen to in the heat of conflict.

Beck's real priority is the hunt for "terrorist" Sarah Mason, a mission that continues to fail, to the detriment of his career. Thomas Valente sends John Goetz to replace him as chief administrator and take care of the day-to-day administration of the town while he  finds Sarah.  Beck lacks authority to rein in Goetz. After Goetz kills Bonnie Richmond, Beck forbids revenge killings, to no avail. With Goetz and his team killed, Beck reassumes his position as chief administrator and puts Jericho into lockdown while he hunts for the shooters (especially Stanley Richmond). Beck takes Jake into custody and tortures him, determined to show both Jake and the Jericho Rangers who is in charge; but Jake is rescued and open conflict develops between the townspeople and Beck's troops.

Robert Hawkins convinces Beck to work with him in investigating the conspiracy surrounding the Attacks, and gradually reveals what he has learned so far. Ultimately, Beck, learning that the new government covered up the origins of the bombs and unjustly destroyed Iran and North Korea, lays the case before his subordinate officers and tells them he will no longer take orders from the ASA. Expecting his officers to arrest him and send him to Cheyenne for court-martial, as a last official act he pardons Stanley and the Rangers of their apparent crimes. Instead of arresting him, the officers are persuaded by Hawkins' evidence and side with Beck, who orders them to get the battalion and Jericho ready for the Second American Civil War.

Major Love Triangles
Emily→Jake→Heather

Roger→Emily→Jake

Sarah→Hawkins→Darcy

April→Eric→Mary

Recurring characters

Longtime residents of Jericho

Mary Bailey
Mary Bailey (portrayed by Clare Carey) is the owner of the Bailey's Tavern bar and mistress of Eric Green, having an on-and-off affair with him and hoping that he will eventually leave his wife April. After the September Attacks, Mary hosts various people left stranded by the attacks, and uses a satellite dish to obtain news of the outside world. Eventually, Eric admits his love for Mary. This causes tension between the three and infuriates Gail. As a child, Mary was left alone with her father after her mother left with another man; thus, upon learning that April is pregnant with Eric's child, she fears being the cause of depriving that child of its father. When April and the baby both die, Mary mourns alongside Eric.

In Season 2, Mary finds her bar back in business with the arrival of the A.S. Army, and eventually uses it as a hiding and meeting place for the Jericho Rangers in their growing struggle against the Allied States of America.

Deputy Ridley Cooper
Ridley Cooper (portrayed by Jason Collins) is a deputy sheriff of Jericho; following the September Attacks, he is one of the few Jericho law enforcement officers left in Jericho after escaped prisoners kill the Sheriff and other deputies. Cooper plans at first to leave town because of the food shortage, but changes his mind when the fake Marines say that food will soon arrive.

Sean Henthorn
Sean Henthorn (portrayed by Shiloh Fernandez) is the leader of a trio of trouble-making teens who harass Dale, trying to take advantage of Dale's inheritance. Sean begins dating Bonnie and moves onto the Richmond farm. Though Stanley and Mimi dislike it, they let him stay in order to appease Bonnie.

Mitch Cafferty
Mitchell "Mitch" Cafferty (portrayed by Clayne Crawford) was a former friend of Jake Green and a member of Jonah Prowse's group of survivalists. Five years before the series, Mitch, Jake and Chris Sullivan (Emily's brother and Mitch's best friend) attempted an armed robbery under Jonah's orders. The attempt was botched; Chris was killed, Jake fled from Jericho, and Mitch went to jail. Both Jonah and Mitchell blamed Jake for failing to watch Chris's back, and Mitch especially hated him for abandoning Mitch to be arrested.

After the September Attacks, Mitch reappears in Jericho to harass the townspeople, again working with Jonah's band of survivalists, and is unpleasantly surprised to see in Bailey's Tavern, as he and the other survivalists assumed Jake had perished in the Denver blast. Mitchell tries to ambush Jake and take him to Jonah, but is arrested himself and thrown in jail. Mitch is later released by Jonah's men. Later, in a dispute between Jonah's gang and the Jericho townspeople, Jonah prevents Mitch from killing Jonah's daughter Emily Sullivan, causing Mitch to lose faith in Jonah's leadership, believing he has gone soft and his mistakes are costing the group. Mitch kills Gracie Leigh, intending that Jonah take the blame, and then tries to kill Jonah himself but only succeeds in driving him away. Later, Mitch extorts protection money from Dale Turner (inheritor of Gracie's Market), revealing himself as the killer. With Mayor Anderson unwilling and the Green family unable to help him, Dale shoots Mitch.

April Green
April Green (portrayed by Darby Stanchfield) is a doctor at Jericho's medical center, and unhappily married to Eric; she files for divorce but, after the Attacks, changes her mind and decides to make the marriage work. April finds out she is pregnant by Eric, but also learns that Eric is in love with Mary Bailey.

April shows her strength in her desperate efforts to keep the townspeople healthy without necessary equipment and medicine.

April suffers a hemorrhage related to her pregnancy and its discovered that her placenta grew into the uterus wall and began ripping away. Emergency surgery is performed in an attempt to save her life during which the baby dies with Kenchay admitting they didn't think they could save the baby and were only focusing on saving April. However, power goes out and Kenchay can't see enough to stop the bleeding, eventually declaring it to be a lost cause and ordering the team to close April up so she can die in peace. Jake convinces Kenchay to finish the surgery even though he knows April won't survive either way and April regains consciousness with Eric at her side for long enough to name the baby Tracy before dying.

Gracie Leigh
Gracie Leigh (portrayed by Beth Grant) owns a grocery store, Gracie's Market. Although kind and generous when the right people approach her (even giving Dale Turner a place to sleep after his mother is killed in the Atlanta explosion and after his home burned down), Gracie is nosy, opinionated and somewhat ruthless in business. This would cause her to come into conflict with Dale. Gracie shares the store's profit with Jonah Prowse by charging high prices and even bartering for family heirlooms, causing resentment among Jericho's residents.  She eventually breaks off the deal to use the store to distribute outside supplies, and is killed in revenge by Mitchell Cafferty, who frames Jonah for it. As a sign of her trust in Dale, Gracie leaves the store to him in her will.

Deputy Bill Koehler
Bill Koehler (portrayed by Richard Speight, Jr.) is a deputy sheriff of Jericho and, following the September Attacks, is one of the few Jericho law enforcement officers left in Jericho after escaped prisoners killed the Sheriff and other deputies. He works with Jimmy Taylor to patrol the town and enforce the law. He later joins the Jericho Rangers.

Bill takes his job very seriously, especially compared to Jimmy. He tends to side with decisions that favor brute force or absolute action over diplomatic means, and preferred Gray Anderson's more strict policies regarding the ejection of refugees when the town's food supplies started to dwindle.

Skylar Stevens
Skylar Stevens (portrayed by Candace Bailey) is a teenage girl from a rich and affluent family that owns part of the Jericho salt mines. After the September Attacks, Skylar was left alone; her parents, who she meant everything to, were away in New York City at the time, and Skylar was left believing her parents to be deceased. She later learns that New York City wasn't destroyed, giving her hope of their safety. She befriends Dale after originally belittling him with her friends, and eventually provides shelter for him, bails him out of jail, and helps him with Gracie's store. With time, the two developed a romantic interest in each other. Skylar continues helping Dale run his business.

Deputy Jimmy Taylor
Jimmy Taylor (portrayed by Bob Stephenson) is a deputy sheriff of Jericho and, following the September Attacks, is one of the few Jericho law enforcement officers left in Jericho after escaped prisoners killed the Sheriff and other deputies. He works with Bill Koehler to patrol the town and enforce the law. He later joins the Jericho Rangers. Jimmy tends to be very polite and friendly towards others, engaging in small talk often to the point of rambling aimlessly. While he means well, he tends to show up at the most inopportune times, causing other characters to become impatient with him.

Jimmy is appointed  Sheriff, but is injured during the final battle of the New Bern War; while he is in hospital, Major Beck replaces him with Jake Green, whom Beck considers a better leader.  Jimmy later returns to duty, and accepts that Jake is now his boss.

Characters deceased

Mayor Eric Green
Eric Jacob Green, Sr. (portrayed by David Huddleston) was the father of Johnston, father-in-law of Gail and grandfather of Jake and Eric. He relates very much to Jake. On the first episode, Gail and Jake go to see his grave while talking about Jake's relationship with Johnston. Eric appears in Jake's flashback memories. They show that Eric gives great advice and is a little more patient than Johnston. In episode 6 of Season 2, while Jake is imprisoned, he has a dream in which his grandfather gives him the confidence to stand against Beck.

Chris Sullivan
Christopher "Chris" Sullivan (who never appeared in any flashback) was the son of Jonah and brother of Emily. He was also a member of Jonah's gang which included his best friend Mitch Cafferty and Jake Green. Jonah sent the three to perform an armed robbery. The failed attempt ended with Chris shot in the head, Mitch arrested, and Jake fleeing Jericho. Jonah and Mitch blamed Jake for being a coward, and Emily blamed Jonah for involving Chris in the first place. It also hurt the Green family because Jake was involved.

New residents of Jericho

Darcy Hawkins
Darcy Hawkins (portrayed by April Parker-Jones) is Robert Hawkins' estranged wife. She and her children move from Washington D.C., where she was seeing a man named Doug. She dislikes Robert's career in the CIA because it requires him to disappear for long periods. Even though she still loves him, she is worried about the danger he can bring to her and their children. She wanted Robert to stay with the family and give up his job with the CIA, and responds to his hints that he might leave his work and re-establish their family.

After the September Attacks, Darcy was very unhappy to be in Jericho at first. When Robert's former associate Sarah Mason arrives with Roger Hammond's group of refugees, Darcy's hunch that Sarah is "not on our side" is confirmed when Sarah takes Samuel hostage to get the last nuclear weapon from Robert. After Allison kills Sarah, Darcy takes the children and moves out of the house temporarily, saying there is no way they can possibly work out the relationship.  When Jericho is attacked by New Bern with mortars, Robert finds Darcy and work together to defend Jericho, before the war with New Bern is stopped by the ASA.

In Season 2, Darcy comes to realize how much Robert means to her, and once she realizes the stakes at hand, she becomes a great help to him by spying on Major Beck while doing security work at the Sheriff's office. After Robert is forced to claim he was undercover FBI for the US, Beck, while agreeing to work with Robert to uncover the story behind the attacks, nonetheless insists that Darcy be out of the office. When Robert has to leave town to deliver the bomb to Texas, Darcy and Robert finally put the past behind them, knowing this is a dangerous mission.

Samuel Hawkins
Samuel Hawkins (portrayed by Sterling Ardrey) is the eight-year-old son of Darcy and Robert. Unlike his older sister, Samuel is innocent and naive of the events around him.

Allison Hawkins
Allison Hawkins (portrayed by Jazz Raycole) is the teenaged daughter of Darcy and Robert. At first, she is very distant from her father and rejects any instructions from him. After she learns that her father knew the September Attacks were coming, and that his efforts saved their lives, they begin to bond; Robert teaches her to properly shoot guns and to type straight IP addresses.  She shows her loyalty and tough-mindedness by killing Sarah Mason when she takes Samuel hostage.

Dr. Kenchy Dhuwalia
Doctor Kenchy Dhuwalia (portrayed by Aasif Mandvi) joined the Red Cross to escape Las Vegas, where supplies of water and electricity were crippled by the attacks. He was sent by the Federal Emergency Management Agency (FEMA) to Rogue River, where he is the only survivor of a massacre by Ravenwood. Haunted by memories of that event, he develops a drinking problem.

Jake and Eric bring Kenchy to Jericho. He saves Johnston Green from flu and treats Jonah Prowse's injured arm. After failing to save April Green and her unborn child, he stops drinking and takes over running the clinic full-time. In this role, he administers vaccinations for the "Hudson River Virus".

Jessica Williams
Jessica Williams (portrayed by Erica Tazel) is a medical student who comes to Jericho as one of Roger Hammond's group of refugees. She volunteers at the clinic and participates in important operations, such as the attempt to save April Green and the treatment of Gray's bullet wound.

Sarah Mason
Sarah Mason (portrayed by Siena Goines) was a CIA deep-cover agent, participant in Project Red Bell, and lover of her teammate Robert Hawkins. Sarah was a traitor to the team, loyal to those responsible for the September Attacks. Sarah pretended to be kidnapped by a group seeking the device as ransom, but the nuclear attacks happened before anything could be discussed.

Following the Attacks and the deaths of the other members of Red Bell, Sarah comes to Jericho as a refugee, and re-connects with Robert, planning to obtain the 20-kiloton nuclear device in his possession and keep it for herself, double-crossing her employers. Sarah initially gains Robert's trust, but he comes to suspect her, so she seizes his son Samuel as a hostage, whereupon she is killed by Allison Hawkins.

In Season 2, the ASA, unaware of Sarah's death, declares her a terrorist to be shot on sight, alleging that she had a hand in the Attacks, in order to suppress what she knows. Major Beck leads the hunt for her (and his failure in this damages his position) until "John Smith" calls Beck and reveals enough truth to frame Hawkins as a terrorist and (temporarily) cost him the bomb.

Residents of New Bern

Russell
Russell (portrayed by David Meunier) is a man from New Bern who delivered a windmill to Jericho and helped the two towns develop a trading system. When tensions grew, Russell tried to maintain the peace, first by opening up trade with the outside world, and secondly by assisting Johnston Green when he is in New Bern looking for Jake and Eric. In gratitude, Johnston invites him to leave for Jericho when New Bern becomes completely hostile to them; but Russell, having a wife and daughter in the town, gently declines.

In Season 2, New Bern was put in a choke-hold by Major Beck after it was identified as the aggressor in their fight with Jericho. Its residents suffering under lockdown, the New Bern Resistance came together not long after, with Phil Constantino leading them, and Russell a member as well. 

Russell and the Resistance found themselves fighting a larger and better-equipped army, and their circumstances worsen when Constantino learns that Heather was unknowingly aiding Beck in putting down Resistance activity, getting his men killed in the process. Constantino puts a bounty on her head, and Russell and Ted Lewis are sent to collect it. Instead of killing Heather, Russell explained what was happening and the impact of Heather's actions, and instead opted to hunt down and kill John Goetz. He uses this improvement in resolve to continue their fight, with Russell driven to do so because he had three killings to answer for in New Bern during his team's attack on the town and the ASA government was doing nothing about it.   With assistance of the Jericho Rangers, Russell and his men deliver Goetz's corpse to New Bern, and so the Resistance claims responsibility. Later, Beck has Russell captured and tortured for information on the shootings, and ultimately he capitulates and tells all, admitting that Stanley Richmond killed Goetz.  After being released, Russell continues the fight against the ASA, now alongside Jericho.

Phil Constantino
Phil Constantino (portrayed by Timothy Omundson) was originally the sheriff and town manager of New Bern and old friend of Johnston Green. Following the September Attacks, Constantino resorts to severe and amoral methods to keep New Bern supplied and protected, with the desperate New Bern townspeople supporting him. These efforts ultimately end his friendship with Johnston. He seizes Eric and Jake as "saboteurs" when they learn that a New Bern factory is working on munitions; men from Jericho kill eight deputies in the process of rescuing them, and Constantino uses this as pretext for an attempt to conquer Jericho and seize its resources. This attempt, dubbed the New Bern War, is stopped by the ASA, but not before Johnston Green is killed (to Constantino's regret). The people of Jericho demand Constantino's death, but the ASA instead removes him from office and puts him to work in a New Bern factory.

Major Beck blames New Bern for the conflict and puts the town under heavy restrictions, provoking a resistance led by Constantino. Constantino learns that Heather is unknowingly helping Beck against the New Bern Resistance, and puts a bounty on her head, although Russell (presumably) gets it lifted by delivering John Goetz's corpse, improving their resolve to fight.

In the Season 2 finale, Jericho is also suffering from Beck's restrictions, and Constantino has a secret meeting with Eric to discuss working together against Beck. However, Constantino tells Eric that he must stop leaving survivors when attacking military convoys. Constantino explains that the only way to win is to make the military realize fighting their town is too costly and not worth pursuing further. Eric finds this tactic fundamentally wrong, and he decides against joining forces with Constantino.

Ted Lewis
Ted Lewis (portrayed by Dustin Seavy) is a man from New Bern and a childhood friend of Heather. After the September Attacks, he meets Heather by chance at the Black Jack fairgrounds. Ted and Russell propose that the two towns become trading partners.  Later, when tensions rise between Jericho and New Bern, Ted helps Jake and Hawkins, but runs off after failing to break them out of jail. In Season 2, Ted returns, revealing he has joined the New Bern Resistance.

Drifters/location unknown

Roger Hammond
Roger Hammond (portrayed by Christopher Wiehl) was a wealthy and successful banker from Chicago who was engaged to Emily Sullivan (against his parents' disapproval) before the September Attacks. He wanted to move to Chicago, but Emily was attached to Jericho, and so Roger leaves her to interview for a new job in Chicago, but changes his mind once arriving there.  Roger is flying back to Jericho when the Attacks happen, and the plane crash-lands safely in a field. Eventually, Roger makes it back to Jericho with a group of refugees and resumes his relationship with Emily (who had believed and accepted he was dead).  

In an attempt to force Mayor Gray Anderson to let the refugees stay, Roger shoots and wounds him. In the end, the townspeople take the refugees in, but Roger himself is exiled from Jericho. Emily offers to go with him, but Roger convinces her it is for the best that she stay with Jake. Roger then leaves for New Bern and is never seen or heard from again.

Jonah Prowse
Jonah Prowse (portrayed by James Remar) is the leader of a group of survivalists settled outside of the town, and father of Emily Sullivan. Before the series, Jonah was a freight worker who had a side business in crime. Former members of his gang included Jake Green and Prowse's son Chris Sullivan. Five years before the Attacks, Jonah sent them and Chris's best friend Mitchell Cafferty on an armed robbery, in which Chris was killed and Mitch arrested, whereupon Jake fled from Jericho.  Emily blamed Chris's death on Jonah; Jonah and Mitch blamed Jake, for failing to watch Chris's back.

After the September Attacks, Jonah's side business becomes permanent and he finds himself commanding a number of young men, including Mitchell, and possessing access to weapons and supplies that Jericho desperately needs. Relations between his group and Jericho are awkward, with mistrust on both sides. Mitch, disappointed in Jonah's "soft" conduct in a confrontation with Jericho, revolts by framing him for the murder of Gracie Leigh. Jonah is almost lynched for this, but the Greens save his life by exiling him from Jericho. Before leaving, Jonah gains some sense of peace with his daughter.

Later, Jonah commands a road gang of thirty men, raiding shipments of supplies being funnelled by the New Bern Army for its planned raid on Jericho. He and the Jericho Rangers learn of each other's activities when they try to intercept the same supply shipment. Jonah asks Emily to join his group, fearing for her safety in the imminent conflict. Emily instead persuades him to aid the Rangers in taking out the New Bern Army's mortar team, in exchange for half of their recovered weapons and ammunition.  This succeeds, but Jonah has become more ruthless and amoral: he personally kills surviving New Bern soldiers and takes all of the weapons and ammo for himself and his gang. Jake desperately protests that the Rangers need these supplies for the imminent invasion; but Jonah has not forgiven Jericho for almost lynching him. He harshly reprimands Emily for her role, and departs.

In Season 2, Jake mentions that Jonah and his gang are still operating in the area, despite the A.S. Army occupation.

"Corporal" Maggie Mullen
Maggie Mullen (portrayed by Erin Daniels) was, following the September Attacks, a refugee from Columbus. Along with a group of other refugees, Maggie and the others took advantage of supplies and leftover equipment left behind by Marines in a refugee camp, and so the group formed an elaborate scheme to con towns out of food and supplies by posing as Marines themselves on a relief effort. Their scheme is busted in Jericho, and they are kicked out of the town. She is later arrested in New Bern while trying the same, where she attempts to help Hawkins sabotage its efforts to bomb the factory used to create munitions for the imminent New Bern War, but she is severely wounded in the process. It is unknown if she survived.

Chavez
Chavez (portrayed by Chris Kramer) is a CIA deep-cover agent; he and his friend Robert Hawkins are the last survivors of Project Red Bell. His cover identity was that of a soldier, Lieutenant Parker, who was killed in Afghanistan; in that persona he infiltrates the ASA military, and arrives in Jericho with Major Beck in season 2. Chavez/Parker becomes Hawkins' spy in Beck's camp. He provides information on the cover-up of the September Attacks, and outlines a new mission: to deliver the last nuclear weapon, now in Hawkins' possession, to the independent Republic of Texas to expose Cheyenne's cover-up before Texas sides with the ASA to defeat the eastern remnant of the US.

Working with Jake Green, Chavez and Hawkins retrieve the information on the cover ups, but Chavez himself is caught and his cover exposed. Hawkins is reluctant to jeopardize the mission by trying to rescue him, but needs Chavez's contacts in Texas.  With Jake's help, Chavez escapes while being transported to Loomer Ridge Prison; he travels to Texas to plead the cover-up case, planning to get Hawkins to bring the bomb as proof. In the Season 2 finale, Chavez finalizes arrangements for his contacts to hear out Hawkins and analyze the bomb's origin. Hawkins and Jake deliver the bomb to Texas. As they watch the bomb being loaded and taken away, Chavez tells Jake to expect Texas siding with the US, and then the "main event" - the Second American Civil War.

Cheung
Cheung (portrayed by Brian Tee) is a CIA deep-cover agent; he and his friend Robert Hawkins are the last survivors of Project Red Bell. He was based in Cheyenne, and helps Hawkins and Jake recover the bomb in the season 2 finale. During this, he is shot and killed by "John Smith".

Victor Miller
Victor Miller (portrayed by Adam Donshik) was a CIA deep-cover agent; he persuaded Robert Hawkins to come out of retirement to take part in Project Red Bell. Victor survives the bombing of Denver. The orders for Red Bell, if they failed to stop the September Attacks, were to rendezvous in Jericho with family members only; but Victor, unwilling to stand by and see others die, gathers twenty survivors along with his daughter. All of them, including Victor, develop radiation sickness. Leaving the group encamped at a lake near Jericho, Victor finds an abandoned truck and drives to Jericho alone to seek help.

Jake finds Victor trying to break into a pharmacy. Victor collapses and is hospitalized. Before he dies, he tells Hawkins that there was a traitor on the team (later revealed to be Sarah Mason).

When people from Jericho reach Victor's group at the lake, all of them have already died of radiation sickness.

Members of the Allied States government or military

Thomas Valente
Thomas Valente (portrayed by Daniel Benzali) was a high-ranking official in the domestic nuclear detection office of the Department of Homeland Security. Valente supervised Project Red Bell, and was also among the leaders of the nuclear plot which, with Valente and Sarah Mason sabotaging Red Bell's efforts to stop it, succeeded.

Afterwards, Valente is associated with the reconstruction of the federal government in Cheyenne, Wyoming, and becomes one of the 8 members of the leadership of the Allied States of America. Valente sends Major Beck and his battalion to Jericho to end their border war with New Bern, and makes it clear his primary objective is to find and kill Sarah Mason (though by this point she is long dead). Valente grows tired of Beck's delays and failures, as well as the growing fear of the conspirators that Beck might be close to the truth. Valente sends John Goetz to replace him as the town's chief administrator (Beck would later get the position back upon Goetz's death).

Hawkins suspects Valente as the mastermind behind the Attacks, though it is later revealed that Valente, Tomarchio and others were pawns of the mysterious "John Smith".

Senator/President John Tomarchio
John Tomarchio (portrayed by George Newbern) was a Jennings & Rall executive, until the company supported his run for public office; he became a Senator for Wyoming. Tomarchio conspired with Thomas Valente and others to carry out the September Attacks and, afterwards, form a new government. With the backing of J&R and elements of the military, Tomarchio's "Allied States of America" is one of three regimes to emerge from the initial chaos, ruling the states west of the Mississippi except for Texas. Cheyenne's media portray President Tomarchio as a hero who saved the country in its time of need. Tomarchio visits the Richmond farm at Jericho to announce the formation of the ASA to the world. The name for the character comes from Jack Tomarchio, a former member of the Department of Homeland Security under George W. Bush, a friend of one of the writers, and a consultant to the show.

Jennings & Rall

Trish Merrick
Patricia "Trish" Merrick (portrayed by Emily Rose) is a staff member of Jennings & Rall based in Jericho. She works with Mimi Clark and they become friends. Trish helps Stanley regain ownership of his farm. She secretly helps Jericho obtain vaccine against the Hudson River Virus, persuading Goetz that it was destroyed. Trish knows sign language and befriends Bonnie.

Trish unknowingly reveals to Goetz that Mimi knows about his embezzlement, leading to his raid on the Richmond farm in which Bonnie is killed. Consumed with guilt, Trish works with Mimi to expose Goetz's crimes, resulting in his dismissal. Trish orders Goetz and his team abandoned in the wilderness and departs with other Ravenwood forces. With the town locked down in the aftermath of Goetz's death, Trish never returns.

John Smith
"David Reynolds (AKA John Smith)" (portrayed by Xander Berkeley) is the alias of a secret informant who contacts Robert Hawkins. Virtually nothing is known of "Smith" but he has full knowledge of Project Red Bell and Sarah Mason's betrayal. In the Civil War Comic Series, "Smith's" identity is revealed to be David Reynolds, a former employee of J&R. "Smith" helps Hawkins to uncover the conspiracy and also provides behind-the-scenes aid to Hawkins in maintaining his cover and to Jericho in its struggles against John Goetz. It is ultimately revealed, however, that "Smith" was the mysterious mastermind and true perpetrator (Tomarchio, Valente and others being merely his pawns) behind the September Attacks - which, "Smith" reveals, was his grand effort to protect the United States by completely destroying Jennings & Rall, his former employers, whom he saw as a cancer at the heart of the U.S. federal government. He seeks to use Hawkins' bomb to destroy Cheyenne, the headquarters of J&R and capital of the ASA. Seeing that Hawkins would not cooperate, "Smith" reveals to Major Beck that Sarah was dead and labels Hawkins as the real terrorist - costing him the bomb which is transported to Cheyenne, where "Smith", having countless connections, could get it away from the military and into his hands. By doing so, however, "Smith" lets Hawkins know his part in the conspiracy. Jake and Hawkins go to Cheyenne and get the bomb back; Jake shoots and wounds "Smith" (who is disguised as an emergency medical technician).

John Goetz
John Goetz (portrayed by D. B. Sweeney) appears first as a Ravenwood mercenary squad leader. Goetz's team raid Rogue River for supplies, and later journey to Jericho seeking to do the same but are stopped by an armed checkpoint, surrounded and forced to withdraw. Goetz then raids New Bern, which is less prepared to resist, and this attack starts a chain of events leading to New Bern's war with Jericho.

Goetz returns in Season 2, sent by Jennings & Rall (as a private contractor for the Allied States of America) to replace Major Beck as Jericho's chief administrator. Goetz abuses his position, with the Jericho Rangers, most especially Jake, playing a delicate cat-and-mouse game with him. When Goetz learns that Mimi Clark has records proving that he is guilty of embezzling money from Jennings & Rall, he attempts to kill her at the Richmond farm; she is only wounded but Bonnie Richmond is killed defending her. With Beck distracted by the New Bern Resistance, the Jericho Rangers, because of Goetz's actions, expose Goetz's crimes to the government. Goetz is fired and removed from power and his team discharged. The Jericho Rangers join forces with members of the New Bern Resistance members (who came to kill Goetz in response for three killings in his attack on their town) to wipe out Goetz's team. Goetz himself is shot by Bonnie's brother Stanley Richmond. Knowing this would cause Beck to punish both towns, New Bern Resistance accept responsibility for Goetz's death, and hang his body in a tree near New Bern's entrance.

References

Characters
Jericho
Jericho